Pickaxe Pete is a platform game released as cartridge number 43 for the Philips Videopac console. It was published in North America for the Magnavox Odyssey² as Pick Axe Pete!. In Brazil, Pickaxe Pete was re-branded as Didi na Mina Encantada (Didi in the Enchanted Mine) for the Odyssey. Pickaxe Pete was designed by Ed Averett, who wrote the majority of the games for the system. 

A U.S. national competition, "The Pick Axe Pete Pick-Off," was held at the World's Fair in October 1982.

Gameplay
The player controls a miner named Pickaxe Pete, and starts off in the middle of the screen with a pick-axe. There are three doors from which boulders are coming, bouncing down the mine-shafts; every time Pete destroys one of these he gains 3 points, although the axe wears out after a while and disappears. When two boulders collide, they explode, and out comes either a pick-axe which floats to the bottom of the screen, a key which floats to the top, or nothing. If Pete has no axe, the player can either jump over boulders (gaining him 1 point), or get to the bottom of the mine to retrieve a new axe (gaining a 5-point bonus). If Pete collects a key then he can enter the doors, which lead him to the next level.

References

External links
 

1982 video games
Platform games
Video games developed in the United States
Magnavox Odyssey 2 games